| tries = {{#expr:
  + 5 +  2 +  4 + 4 +  3 + 12
  + 1 +  7 +  3 + 5 +  2 +  2
  + 2 +  2 +  8 + 5 +  9 +  2
  + 7 +  6 +  5 + 2 +  8 +  6
  + 3 +  1 +  5 + 4 +  4 +  2
  + 9 +  6 +  6 + 1 +  5 +  4
  + 6 +  3 +  6 + 6 +  2 +  1
  + 5 +  1 +  1 + 1 +  4 +  4
  + 4 +  3 +  6 + 8 +  1 
 + 5 +  1 +  6 + 3 +  3 +  4
 + 3 +  7 +  1 + 1 +  2 +  3
 + 4 +  3 +  3  
 + 3 +  1 +  6 + 5 +  1 +  4
 + 4
 + 6 +  8 +  3 + 3 +  2 +  5
 + 5 +  3 +  7 + 2 + 10 +  4
 + 2 +  6 +  3 + 5 +  3 +  5
 + 5 +  7 +  4 + 2 +  5 +  6
 + 7
 + 0
 + 7 +  9 +  4 + 2 +  1 +  3
 + 7 +  4 +  3 + 4 +  7 +  2
 + 9
 + 7 +  8 +  8 + 9 +  6 +  4
 + 6 + 12 +  5 + 8 +  3 +  6
 + 3 +  6 + 11 + 5 + 10 +  8
 + 5 +  2 +  4
}}
| top point scorer = 
| top try scorer = Craig Gilroy (Ulster)Matt Healy (Connacht)(10 tries each)
| website = www.pro12rugby.com
| prevseason = 2014–15
| nextseason = 2016–17
}}

The 2015–16 Pro12 (also known as the Guinness Pro12 for sponsorship reasons) was the fifteenth season of the professional rugby union competition originally known as the Celtic League, and the sixth with its current four-country format. it was the second season to be referred to as the Guinness Pro12.

The twelve competing teams were the four Irish teams: Connacht, Leinster, Munster and Ulster; two Italian teams: Benetton Treviso and Zebre; two Scottish teams: Edinburgh and Glasgow Warriors and four Welsh teams: Cardiff Blues, Newport Gwent Dragons, Ospreys and Scarlets. The first stage involved the twelve teams playing home and away in a league format with the top four sides qualifying for the semi-finals. The semi finals were one legged affairs with 1st playing 4th and 2nd playing 3rd and the higher ranked team gaining home advantage. The winners of the semi finals proceeded to the Pro12 final, held at Murrayfield Stadium in Edinburgh, Scotland.

Glasgow were the defending champions having beaten Munster 31–13 in the previous season's play-off final, taking their first Pro12 title. They were unable to defend their title, after losing 16–11 to Connacht in the play-off semi-final. Connacht – who qualified for the play-offs for the first time – then proceeded to defeat Leinster 20–10 in the final, to become the seventh team to win the league title. Connacht had one of the top try scorers for the season, as Matt Healy and along with Ulster's Craig Gilroy, each scored 10 tries during the season. Rhys Patchell of Cardiff Blues was the competition's top points scorer, with 174.

Changes for the season

All countries
With the 2015 Rugby World Cup taking place during the opening months of the season, changes were made to the usual fixture schedule to minimise the effect on teams who released players to take part. The low number of games in the opening weeks of the season led to fixture congestion at the end of the tournament, with team playing a game every weekend for 16 weeks straight from October 2015 to January 2016, including European matches.

As in the previous season, qualification to the Champions Cup was guaranteed to the top team from each country participating in the league, with the three highest placed team's not already qualified also earning a berth. Unlike in the previous season where the 20th tournament spot was decided by a play-off involving teams from the Pro12, France's Top 14 and the English Premiership, due to fixture congestion from the World Cup, the final spot in the tournament was reserved for the winner of the 2015 Challenge Cup if not already qualified.

Ireland
Connacht came into the season without their long-serving forwards coach Dan McFarland, following his move to Glasgow Warriors. McFarland had been with Connacht as a player and later coach since 2000. It was also the team's first season in the competition without Michael Swift, their former captain who retired as the record holder for appearances both in the league and for the province.

Following a disappointing 2014–15 season, Leinster terminated the contract of head coach Matt O'Connor. Former captain and previous season's forwards coach Leo Cullen was initially named as temporary head coach following the dismissal, before being named to the position permanently on a two-year deal. With the previous season's captain Jamie Heaslip missing the start of the season to play for Ireland at the World Cup, Kevin McLaughlin was named captain of the team. After suffering a concussion in the first game of the season however, McLaughlin was forced to retire from the game, and was replaced in the role by Isa Nacewa who rejoined Leinster after returning from retirement. The season also saw the departure of Gordon D'Arcy, record holder for appearances for the province. D'Arcy had announced his intention to retire after the World Cup earlier in the year, but ultimately didn't make the final Irish squad and played with Leinster until the conclusion of the tournament.

Munster captain Peter O'Mahony missed the early season due to the World Cup, and suffered a serious injury in Ireland's game against France. South Africa-born player CJ Stander, who became Irish-qualified during the course of the season, served as captain in his place. The close season also saw the departure of long-serving players Donncha O'Callaghan and Paul O'Connell, both of whom had played for the province since before the league's foundation. O'Callaghan, the province's record holder for appearances, was released from the final year of his contract to join newly promoted English Premiership side Worcester Warriors. Like O'Callaghan, O'Connell was released from the final year of his contract on request. He agreed a deal to join Toulon after the World Cup on a two-year deal, but an injury suffered at the tournament ultimately forced him to retire from the game before he could play for them.

Over a year after the departures of David Humphreys and Mark Anscombe, Les Kiss took over as Ulster Director of Rugby in October 2015. Neil Doak, who had served as head coach while Kiss continued in his role as Ireland defence coach, remained on the coaching staff working under him. With Rory Best away at the World Cup during the start of the season, Rob Herring was named captain on an interim basis.

Italy
Benetton Treviso's captain Antonio Pavanello retired from playing at the end of the previous season, taking up a role as Sporting Director. Alessandro Zanni was named as his replacement, with Davide Giazzon and Edoardo Gori as his vice-captains. With all three players away representing Italy in the World Cup, the role was taken by Alberto De Marchi for the early part of the tournament. Umberto Casellato was the team coach at the beginning of the season but was sacked in January 2016, being replaced with Marius Goosen.

At the start of the season George Biagi replaced Marco Bortolami as Zebre's captain. Following the replacement of head coach Andrea Cavinato with Víctor Jiménez during the course of the previous season, Gianluca Guidi entered the tournament as the team's new coach.

Scotland
It was reported during the summer of 2015 that Edinburgh may play some of their home games in Hibernian F.C.'s Easter Road during the season with a view to a permanent ground sharing deal. This is due to Murrayfield Stadium having a capacity of over 67,000 while Edinburgh's home games draw average home crowds of around 4,000. No deal was finalised however, and all of the team's home games were again played at Murrayfield.

Reigning champions Glasgow Warriors came into the season without an appointed captain, following the retirement of Alastair Kellock. Gregor Townsend named Peter Murchie as captain for the duration of the World Cup, with the intention of naming a permanent successor after his international players had returned. In November 2015, it was announced that Jonny Gray would take over the captaincy. During the season, Glasgow were forced to play some home matches in the Pro12 and Champions Cup in Kilmarnock F.C.'s Rugby Park due to heavy rainfall making Scotstoun unplayable.

Wales
Following the departure of Director of Rugby Mark Hammett in February 2015, for personal reasons, Cardiff Blues appointed Danny Wilson their head coach ahead of the new season, replacing caretakers Dale McIntosh and Paul John. The new season also saw veteran prop Gethin Jenkins named captain, replacing Matthew Rees. With Jenkins away at the World Cup with Wales, Josh Navidi captained the team in their early games.

Newport Gwent Dragons captain Lee Byrne was forced to retire in April 2015 after he failed to recover from a shoulder injury. It was announced in July 2015 that Welsh international T. Rhys Thomas would captain the side for the 2015–16 season.

Ospreys captain Alun Wyn Jones missed the start of the season while playing for Wales at the World Cup. In his absence, the side was captained by Lloyd Ashley. Ashley had previously taken on the role at under-age level and in the Anglo-Welsh Cup.

Both Scarlets captain Ken Owens and vice-captain Scott Williams went to the World Cup with Wales, missing the opening rounds of the league. New Zealand born centre Hadleigh Parkes captained the side until their return.

Teams

Table

Fixtures
All times are local.

Round 1

Round 2

Round 3

Round 4

Round 5

Round 6

Round 7

Round 8

Round 9

Round 10

1872 Cup 1st round

Round 11

1872 Cup 2nd round

Round 12

Round 13

Round 12 rescheduled match

This match – originally scheduled to be held during Round 12, on 8 January 2016 – was postponed due to a European Rugby Champions Cup fixture rearrangement that occurred as a result of the Paris terrorist attacks in November 2015.

Round 14

Round 15

Round 16

Round 17

Round 12 rescheduled match

This match – originally scheduled to be held during Round 12, on 8 January 2016 – was postponed due to a European Rugby Champions Cup fixture rearrangement that occurred as a result of the Paris terrorist attacks in November 2015.

Round 9 rescheduled match

This match – originally scheduled to be held during Round 9, on 5 December 2015 – was postponed due to a waterlogged pitch.

Round 18

Round 19

Round 12 rescheduled match

This match – originally scheduled to be held during Round 12, on 8 January 2016 – was postponed due to a European Rugby Champions Cup fixture rearrangement that occurred as a result of the Paris terrorist attacks in November 2015.

Round 20

Round 21

Judgement Day

Notes
 The 68,262 crowd for the two matches, was a Judgement Day and Pro12 match record.

Round 22

Play-offs

Semi-finals

Final

Attendances

Reference:

By club

Includes semi-finals but not final at Murrayfield

Highest attendances

End of Season Awards

PRO12 Dream Team

Award winners

Leading scorers
Note: Flags to the left of player names indicate national team as has been defined under World Rugby eligibility rules, or primary nationality for players who have not yet earned international senior caps. Players may hold one or more non-WR nationalities.

Top points scorers

Top try scorers

Notes

References

External links
 
 2015–16 Pro12 at ESPN

 
 
2015-16
2015–16 in Irish rugby union
2015–16 in Italian rugby union
2015–16 in Scottish rugby union
2015–16 in Welsh rugby union